Purnendu Kumar Banerjee (7 December 1917 – 2003) was Indian Chargé d'affaires in Beijing during the India-China border conflict, also called the Sino-Indian War. He wrote a short book on his encounters with Zhou En Lai (1898–1976). Banerjee was a recipient of the 1963 Padma Shri award, India's fourth highest civilian award. In 1969, he became India's first ambassador to Costa Rica. He was the sixth Ambassador in the Permanent Mission of India to the UN Office in Geneva.

Selected publications

References

External links
P. K. Banerjee publications information from WorldCat

1917 births
2003 deaths
Indian diplomats
Sino-Indian War
Recipients of the Padma Shri in civil service